Magdalena Georgieva Maleeva (born 1 April 1975) is a Bulgarian former professional tennis player. She played on the WTA Tour competing in singles and doubles, from April 1989 to October 2005 and has won ten career singles titles. Her best WTA singles ranking was world No. 4.

Biography
Born in Sofia, Maleeva is the youngest of the three children of Yuliya Berberyan and Georgi Maleev. Yuliya, who came from a prominent Armenian family which found refuge in Bulgaria after the 1896 Armenian massacres in the Ottoman Empire, was one of the best Bulgarian tennis players in the 1960s. After she retired from professional tennis in the 1970s, Berberyan started on a coaching career. She trained all of her three daughters, Magdalena, Katerina and Manuela, each of whom eventually became WTA top six players.

In 1988, Maleeva became the youngest ever national tennis champion of Bulgaria, at the age of 13 years and four months. She turned professional in 1989, reaching the final of her first professional tournament (ITF) at Bari. In her Grand Slam debut at the French Open in 1990, she passed the qualifications and reached the third round. In 1990, Maleeva won three junior Grand Slam tournaments at the Australian, French and US Open. In 1992, Maleeva snatched her first WTA Tour event victory in San Marino and scored her best Grand Slam tournament result with a quarterfinal run at the US Open, upsetting Martina Navratilova on the way. The following year, she reached the fourth round at the Australian, the French and the US Open, as well as the third round of Wimbledon. That same year, she was the opponent of Monica Seles at a tournament in Hamburg, Germany when a deranged fan stabbed Seles in the back on the court.

Her best performance at a Grand Slam championship came when she got to the quarterfinals of the 1992 US Open, defeating Kateřina Kroupová-Šišková, Martina Navratilova, Kimberly Po and Chanda Rubin before losing to her older sister Manuela. In 1995, Maleeva won a total of three tournaments, in Moscow, Chicago, Oakland, which saw her hit a career-high ranking of No. 4 in January 1996.

In June 1998, Maleeva underwent shoulder surgery, which forced her off the tour for the next eleven months. She started competing again in May 1999 and re-entered top 20 in 2001. In 2002, she won the prestigious Kremlin Cup in Moscow, defeating three top-10 players on her way (Venus Williams, Amélie Mauresmo, and Lindsay Davenport). In 2004, she married her long-standing boyfriend, Lubomir Nokov.

Maleeva won a career total of ten WTA titles in singles and five in doubles. She was the recipient of the "WTA Most Improved Player 1993" award and was nominated for the "WTA Most Impressive Newcomer 1990". She participated at the Olympic Games in Barcelona, Atlanta, and Athens.

Life after tennis
In October 2005, Maleeva retired from professional tennis after 16 seasons (years), and became the last of the Maleeva sisters to retire. She now lives in Sofia. On 27 June 2007, she gave birth to her first child, a girl named Youlia, and on 13 December 2008, she gave birth to a second child, Marko, and on 20 August 2012 to their third child, Nina.

Maleeva has been very active with the environmental organization 'Gorichka.bg', which works to create public awareness about urgent environmental problems. She also has created 'Harmonica', a brand for organic foods, as well as a couple of organic food stores in Sofia under the brand 'Biomag'. She is also a partner at the Maleeva Tennis Club.

In October 2010, Maleeva won the Bulgarian national outdoor championship, becoming the youngest and the oldest player to have won it, within 22 years. In 2011, she made a brief tennis comeback, playing and winning three doubles matches for Bulgaria at the Fed Cup.

In March 2011, Maleeva was voted eighth in the "100 most influential women in Bulgaria" by Pari newspaper. She has also appeared at Wimbledon's ladies' invitation doubles event on several occasions, achieving her best result in 2015, where she partnered Rennae Stubbs; the pair defeated Navratilova and Selima Sfar in the final to win the title.

Performance timelines

Singles

Doubles

WTA career finals

Singles: 21 (10 titles, 11 runner-ups)

Doubles: 10 (5 titles, 5 runner–ups)

ITF Circuit finals

Singles: 2 (1–1)

Doubles: 1 (1–0)

Junior Grand Slam tournament finals

Singles: 3 (3 titles)

Fed Cup
Magdalena Maleeva debuted for the Bulgaria Fed Cup team in 1991. Since then, she has an 18–8 singles record and a 9–9 doubles record (27–17 overall).

Singles (18–8)

Doubles (9–9)

 RR = Round Robin
 PPO = Promotion Play-off
 RPO = Relegation Play-off

Head-to head record against other top players
Maleeva's win–loss record against certain players who have been ranked world No. 10 or higher is as follows:
Players who have been ranked World No. 1 are in boldface.

 Chanda Rubin 7–1
 Mary Pierce 4–2
 Arantxa Sánchez Vicario 4–5
 Ai Sugiyama 4–7
 Brenda Schultz-McCarthy 3–1
 Alicia Molik 3–2
 Paola Suárez 3–2
 Helena Suková 3–2
 Venus Williams 3–3
 Lindsay Davenport 3–3
 Patty Schnyder 3–4
 Anke Huber 3–6
 Sandrine Testud 2–0
 Catarina Lindqvist 2–0
 Zina Garrison 2–1
 Lori McNeil 2–1
/ Natasha Zvereva 2–1
 Julie Halard-Decugis 2–1
 Elena Dementieva 2–2
 Pam Shriver 2–2
 Karina Habšudová 2–3
/ Martina Navratilova 2–4
 Nathalie Tauziat 2–7
 Jennifer Capriati 2–8
 Flavia Pennetta 1–0
 Marion Bartoli 1–0
 Gabriela Sabatini 1–0
 Barbara Paulus 1–1
/ Jelena Dokić 1–1
 Dominique Monami 1–1
 Anna Kournikova 1–1
 Francesca Schiavone 1–1
/ Jelena Janković 1–1
 Kimiko Date-Krumm 1–2
 Anna Chakvetadze 1–2
 Mary Joe Fernandez 1–3
 Daniela Hantuchová 1–3
 Justine Henin 1–3
 Amanda Coetzer 1–4
 Iva Majoli 1–4
// Monica Seles 1–4
 Anastasia Myskina 1–4
 Jana Novotná 1–5
 Amélie Mauresmo 1–6
 Conchita Martínez 1–11
 Barbara Schett 0–1
 Dinara Safina 0–1
 Nadia Petrova 0–2
/ Manuela Maleeva-Fragnière 0–2
 Svetlana Kuznetsova 0–2
 Katerina Maleeva 0–4
 Serena Williams 0–4
 Martina Hingis 0–5
 Kim Clijsters 0–6
 Steffi Graf 0–8

See also
 Manuela Maleeva
 Katerina Maleeva
 List of female tennis players

References

External links
 
 
 
 The Maleeva tennis club
 Gorichka.bg

1975 births
Living people
Australian Open (tennis) junior champions
Bulgarian female tennis players
Bulgarian people of Armenian descent
French Open junior champions
Olympic tennis players of Bulgaria
Sportspeople from Sofia
Tennis players at the 1992 Summer Olympics
Tennis players at the 1996 Summer Olympics
Tennis players at the 2004 Summer Olympics
US Open (tennis) junior champions
Grand Slam (tennis) champions in girls' singles
Magdalena